Karloff is a name that is used as a professional name. Notable people who use this name include the following:

Boris Karloff, whose birthname was William Henry Pratt (1887 – 1969), English actor
Karloff Lagarde, stage name of Carlos Delucio Lagarde, uncle of Karloff Lagarde Jr. (1928 – 2007), Mexican Luchador
Karloff Lagarde Jr., stage name of César Baltazar de Lucio Valencia, nephew of Karloff Lagarde (born 1970), Mexican Luchador

See also

Carloff